Daniele Luchetti (born 25 July 1960) is an Italian film director, screenwriter and actor.

Life and career
Luchetti was born in Rome. He debuted as assistant director for Nanni Moretti in Bianca (1983) and The Mass Is Ended (1985). Luchetti's first film as director was It's Happening Tomorrow of 1988, which won a David di Donatello as best debuting film and received a mention in the 1988 Cannes Film Festival.

His subsequent work was the successful The Yes Man (1991), featuring Silvio Orlando as the ghost-writer of a ruthless politician, played by Nanni Moretti. It was seen as a forecast of the Mani Pulite corruption scandal that struck Italy the following year. The film won four David di Donatello awards.

Luchetti's theatre spectacle Sottobanco, inspired to Domenico Starnone's works, was later turned into a feature film entitled La scuola ("The School", 1995).

His most recent films are My Brother Is an Only Child (2006), for which Elio Germano won the David di Donatello as best actor in a leading role, and La nostra vita (2010), which was the only Italian film selected for official competition at the 2010 Cannes Film Festival. Elio Germano shared the prize for Best Actor for his interpretation of Claudio, along with Javier Bardem.

Luchetti has also directed a number of documentaries and advertisements.

Filmography as director
Juke box (several directors, 1985)
It's Happening Tomorrow (1988)
The Week of the Sphinx (1990)
The Yes Man (1991)
The Storm Is Coming (1993)
L'unico paese al mondo (several directors, 1994)
La scuola (1995)
Little Teachers (1998)
Ginger and Cinnamon (2003)
My Brother Is an Only Child (2006)
La nostra vita (2010)
Those Happy Years (2012)
Chiamatemi Francesco (2015)
Io sono Tempesta (2018)
Ordinary Happiness (2019)
The Ties (2020)

References

External links

1960 births
Living people
Male actors from Rome
Italian film directors
Italian theatre directors
Italian screenwriters
Italian male screenwriters
Italian male film actors
David di Donatello winners
Ciak d'oro winners